The 2011 Jigawa State gubernatorial election was the 5th gubernatorial election of Jigawa State, Nigeria. Held on April 26, 2011, the People's Democratic Party nominee Sule Lamido won the election, defeating Mohammed Badaru Abubakar of the Action Congress of Nigeria.

Results 
A total of 9 candidates contested in the election. Sule Lamido from the People's Democratic Party won the election, defeating Mohammed Badaru Abubakar from the Action Congress of Nigeria. Valid votes was 1,094,549, votes cast was 1,153,621, 59,072 votes was cancelled.

References 

Jigawa State gubernatorial elections
Jigawa gubernatorial
April 2011 events in Nigeria